"Expecting to Fly" is a song written by Neil Young and performed by Buffalo Springfield.  The song reached #98 on the Billboard Hot 100 in 1968.  The song appeared on their 1967 album, Buffalo Springfield Again. Producer Jack Nitzsche provided the orchestral arrangement featuring a string section plus an oboe. Live versions from Young's early solo performances appear on the albums Live at the Riverboat 1969, Sugar Mountain – Live at Canterbury House 1968, and Live at the Cellar Door.

In the 2018 music documentary film, Echo in the Canyon, it is suggested "Expecting to Fly" marks and exemplifies a shift in a late 1960s's movement from group-oriented folk rock compositions toward more individualized performances and single-artist recordings.

Other versions
 Thirteen Senses released the song in 2005 in the United Kingdom as the B-side to their single "The Salt Wound Routine".
 Metric recorded a version in 2011.
 Emily Haines occasionally played it live during her Knives Don't Have Your Back shows.
 of Montreal released the song as a single in 2011 in Norway.
 Tom Wilson recorded the song for the Neil Young Tribute Album Borrowed Tunes II: A Tribute to Neil Young, released in 2007.

In media
 Buffalo Springfield's version appears in the films Coming Home (1978), Purple Haze (1982), Fear and Loathing in Las Vegas (1998), and Joy (2015), as well as in the Lillyhammer Season 3 episode "Foreign Affairs" (2014).

References

1967 songs
1967 singles
2005 singles
2011 singles
Songs written by Neil Young
Buffalo Springfield songs
Thirteen Senses songs
Metric (band) songs
Of Montreal songs
Atco Records singles
Vertigo Records singles
Neil Young songs
Song recordings produced by Jack Nitzsche